Faqah, is an old village in the sub-governorate of Bariq in  the province of Asir, Saudi Arabia. It  has a population of 2,000 (1970). It is connected with the main road by a 10 Kilometer. In the 1970s a large number of the people of Faqah left the village and immigrated in many directions in Bilad al-Musa.

See also 

 List of cities and towns in Saudi Arabia
 Regions of Saudi Arabia

References 

Populated places in Bareq
Populated places in 'Asir Province
Populated coastal places in Saudi Arabia